Dylan Casey (born April 13, 1971, in Walnut Creek, California) is a retired American professional cyclist, who rode for  alongside Lance Armstrong.  His career began in 1990 and ended  in 2003.  Over that time, Casey won 12 major races with a team or on his own. He also competed in the Sydney Olympics and won a gold medal at the 1999 Pan American Games. He is a 2 time Professional National Time Trial Champion and in 1999 won National Championships for both the Time Trial and Individual Pursuit; one of only 3 Americans to ever do so. Casey served as a Product Manager at Google, (2003-2011) during which time he helped design their social offering Google+ as well as their famous black bar. Casey left Google for Path in early December 2011. He joined Yahoo! as a Senior Director of Consumer Platforms in May, 2013.

In 2000, Casey became an Olympian when he went to the Olympic Games in Sydney, Australia.  Unfortunately, an injury kept him out of actually competing. The year before he won a gold medal in individual pursuit at the 1999 Pan Am Games.

Casey has stage wins from the 1997 Tour of Ohio and 89er Stage Race and the 1998 Tour of Tucson, which he also won overall. In 1999, Casey came in third overall at the Tour of the Netherlands, sixth at the First Union Invitational and competed at the Tour of Spain. Stage wins in 2000 included one each at the Redlands Classic, the Tour of Luxembourg, and the Four Days of Dunkerque.

Born and raised in California, Casey graduated from Las Lomas High School in Walnut Creek, CA in 1989. He then went on graduate from the University of California, Santa Barbara with a B.S. in communications information systems in 1994

Major results

References 

American male cyclists
1971 births
Living people
Cyclists at the 1999 Pan American Games
Sportspeople from Walnut Creek, California
Google employees
Pan American Games gold medalists for the United States
Olympic cyclists of the United States
Cyclists at the 2000 Summer Olympics
Yahoo! employees
University of California, Santa Barbara alumni
American business executives
Pan American Games medalists in cycling